The North Korean Championship is the national ice hockey championship in North Korea. It was first staged in 1956.

Champions

2017: unknown
2016: Taesongsan
2015: unknown
2014: Champions: Taesongsan, runners-up: Jangjasan, third place: Sobaeksu
2013: Pyongchol Pyongyang
2012: unknown
2011: Pyongchol Pyongyang
2010: Pyongchol Pyongyang
2009: Pyongyang City
2008: Pyongyang City
2007: Pyongchol Pyongyang
2006: Pyongchol Pyongyang
2005: Pyongyang
2004: Pyongchol Pyongyang
2003: Pyongchol Pyongyang
2002: unknown
2001: Pyongchol Pyongyang
2000: unknown
1999: Susan Pyongyang
1998: Pyongchol Pyongyang
1997: Pyongchol Pyongyang
1996: Amrokkang
1995: Amrokkang
1994: Amrokkang
1993: Pyongyang City
1992: Pyongyang City
1991: Pyongyang City
1990: Pyongyang City
1989: April 25
1988: Pyongyang City
1987: Pyongyang City
1986: Pyongyang City
1985: Pyongyang City
1984: Amrokkang
1983: Amrokkang
1982: Amrokkang
1981: Amrokkang
1980: Pyongyang City
1979: Pyongyang City
1978: Pyongyang City
1977: Pyongyang City
1976: Pyongyang City
1975: Chagang (Kanggye)
1974: Pyongyang City
1973: Pyongyang City
1972: Pyongyang City
1971: Pyongyang City
1970: Chagang
1969: Pyongyang City
1968: Pyongyang City
1967: Pyongyang City
1966: Chagang
1965: Pyongyang City
1964: Pyongyang City
1963: Pyongyang City
1956-1962: unknown

References

External links
List of champions  on hokej.cz
List of champions  on hockeyarenas.net

Ice hockey in North Korea
Ice hockey leagues in Asia